All I Need to Know is the second studio album by American country music singer Kenny Chesney. It was released on June 13, 1995 as his first album for BNA Records after leaving Capricorn Records in 1994. It features the singles "Fall in Love", the title track, and "Grandpa Told Me So"; these songs peaked at number six, number eight, and number 23, respectively, on the Billboard country charts in 1995. This is the first album that Kenny Chesney signed contracts with BNA Records in 1995, and remained in use until his last studio album, 2010's "Hemingway's Whiskey".

Content 
This album's recording of "The Tin Man" was previously released on Chesney's 1994 album In My Wildest Dreams. "Me and You", co-written by McBride & the Ride guitarist Ray Herndon, was later included on Chesney's 1996 album of the same name, from which it was released as a single. "Paris, Tennessee" was originally recorded by Tracy Lawrence on his 1991 album Sticks and Stones, and later by Dennis Robbins (who co-wrote it) on his 1992 album Man with a Plan.

Track listing

Personnel
Eddie Bayers – drums
Barry Beckett – keyboards
Kenny Chesney – acoustic guitar, lead vocals
"Cowboy" Eddie Long – steel guitar
Terry McMillan – harmonica, percussion
Phil Naish – keyboards
Bobby Ogdin – keyboards
Don Potter – acoustic guitar
Michael Rhodes – bass guitar
Brent Rowan – electric guitar
Ricky Skaggs – background vocals
Joe Spivey – fiddle
Harry Stinson – background vocals
Dennis Wilson – background vocals
Curtis Young – background vocals

Charts

Weekly charts

Singles

Certifications

References 

1995 albums
Kenny Chesney albums
BNA Records albums
Albums produced by Barry Beckett